This is a list of the bird species recorded in Monaco. The avifauna of Monaco include a total of 192 species.

This list's taxonomic treatment (designation and sequence of orders, families and species) and nomenclature (common and scientific names) follow the conventions of The Clements Checklist of Birds of the World, 2022 edition. The family accounts at the beginning of each heading reflect this taxonomy, as do the species counts found in each family account.

The following tags have been used to highlight some categories of occurrence.

(A) Accidental - a species that rarely or accidentally occurs in Monaco
(I) Introduced - a species introduced to Monaco as a consequence, direct or indirect, of human actions, and has become established

Ducks, geese, and waterfowl
Order: AnseriformesFamily: Anatidae

Anatidae includes the ducks and most duck-like waterfowl, such as geese and swans. These birds are adapted to an aquatic existence with webbed feet, flattened bills, and feathers that are excellent at shedding water due to an oily coating.

Mute swan, Cygnus olor
Common shelduck, Tadorna tadorna
Northern shoveler, Spatula clypeata
Mallard, Anas platyrhynchos
Green-winged teal, Anas crecca
Common pochard, Aythya ferina
Ferruginous duck, Aythya nyroca
Common eider, Somateria mollissima

Pheasants, grouse, and allies
Order: GalliformesFamily: Phasianidae

The Phasianidae are a family of terrestrial birds. In general, they are plump (although they vary in size) and have broad, relatively short wings.

Rock ptarmigan, Lagopus muta
Ring-necked pheasant, Phasianus colchicus (I)
Common quail, Coturnix coturnix
Red-legged partridge, Alectoris rufa
Rock partridge, Alectoris graeca

Grebes
Order: PodicipediformesFamily: Podicipedidae

Grebes are small to medium-large freshwater diving birds. They have lobed toes and are excellent swimmers and divers. However, they have their feet placed far back on the body, making them quite ungainly on land.

Little grebe, Tachybaptus ruficollis
Red-necked grebe, Podiceps grisegena
Great crested grebe, Podiceps cristatus

Pigeons and doves
Order: ColumbiformesFamily: Columbidae

Pigeons and doves are stout-bodied birds with short necks and short slender bills with a fleshy cere.

Rock pigeon, Columba livia
Common wood-pigeon, Columba palumbus
European turtle-dove, Streptopelia turtur
Eurasian collared-dove, Streptopelia decaocto

Cuckoos
Order: CuculiformesFamily: Cuculidae

The family Cuculidae includes cuckoos, roadrunners and anis. These birds are of variable size with slender bodies, long tails and strong legs. The Old World cuckoos are brood parasites.

Great spotted cuckoo, Clamator glandarius'
Common cuckoo, Cuculus canorus'

Nightjars and allies
Order: CaprimulgiformesFamily: Caprimulgidae

Nightjars are medium-sized nocturnal birds that usually nest on the ground. They have long wings, short legs and very short bills. Most have small feet, of little use for walking, and long pointed wings. Their soft plumage is camouflaged to resemble bark or leaves.

Eurasian nightjar, Caprimulgus europaeus

Swifts
Order: CaprimulgiformesFamily: Apodidae

Swifts are small birds which spend the majority of their lives flying. These birds have very short legs and never settle voluntarily on the ground, perching instead only on vertical surfaces. Many swifts have long swept-back wings which resemble a crescent or boomerang.

Alpine swift, Apus melba
Common swift, Apus apus
Pallid swift, Apus pallidus

Rails, gallinules, and coots
Order: GruiformesFamily: Rallidae

Rallidae is a large family of small to medium-sized birds which includes the rails, crakes, coots and gallinules. Typically they inhabit dense vegetation in damp environments near lakes, swamps or rivers. In general they are shy and secretive birds, making them difficult to observe. Most species have strong legs and long toes which are well adapted to soft uneven surfaces. They tend to have short, rounded wings and to be weak fliers.

Eurasian moorhen, Gallinula chloropus
Eurasian coot, Fulica atra

Cranes
Order: GruiformesFamily: Gruidae

Cranes are large, long-legged and long-necked birds. Unlike the similar-looking but unrelated herons, cranes fly with necks outstretched, not pulled back. Most have elaborate and noisy courting displays or "dances".

Common crane, Grus grus

Stilts and avocets
Order: CharadriiformesFamily: Recurvirostridae

Recurvirostridae is a family of large wading birds, which includes the avocets and stilts. The avocets have long legs and long up-curved bills. The stilts have extremely long legs and long, thin, straight bills.

Black-winged stilt, Himantopus himantopus

Plovers and lapwings
Order: CharadriiformesFamily: Charadriidae

The family Charadriidae includes the plovers, dotterels and lapwings. They are small to medium-sized birds with compact bodies, short, thick necks and long, usually pointed, wings. They are found in open country worldwide, mostly in habitats near water.

Little ringed plover, Charadrius dubius

Sandpipers and allies
Order: CharadriiformesFamily: Scolopacidae

Scolopacidae is a large diverse family of small to medium-sized shorebirds including the sandpipers, curlews, godwits, shanks, tattlers, woodcocks, snipes, dowitchers and phalaropes. The majority of these species eat small invertebrates picked out of the mud or soil. Variation in length of legs and bills enables multiple species to feed in the same habitat, particularly on the coast, without direct competition for food.

Eurasian curlew, Numenius arquata
Black-tailed godwit, Limosa limosa
Ruff, Calidris pugnax
Curlew sandpiper, Calidris ferruginea
Temminck's stint, Calidris temminckii
Eurasian woodcock, Scolopax rusticola
Common sandpiper, Actitis hypoleucos
Green sandpiper, Tringa ochropus
Common greenshank, Tringa nebularia
Wood sandpiper, Tringa glareola
Common redshank, Tringa totanus

Auks, murres, and puffins
Order: CharadriiformesFamily: Alcidae

Alcidae are a family of seabirds which are superficially similar to penguins with their black-and-white colors, their upright posture, and some of their habits, but which are able to fly.

Atlantic puffin, Fratercula arctica

Gulls, terns, and skimmers
Order: CharadriiformesFamily: Laridae

Laridae is a family of medium to large seabirds, the gulls, terns, and skimmers. Gulls are typically grey or white, often with black markings on the head or wings. They have stout, longish bills and webbed feet. Terns are a group of generally medium to large seabirds typically with grey or white plumage, often with black markings on the head. Most terns hunt fish by diving but some pick insects off the surface of fresh water. Terns are generally long-lived birds, with several species known to live in excess of 30 years.

Black-legged kittiwake, Rissa tridactyla
Black-headed gull, Chroicocephalus ridibundus
Little gull, Hydrocoloeus minutus
Mediterranean gull, Ichthyaetus melanocephalus
Audouin's gull, Chroicocephalus audouinii
Common gull, Chroicocephalus canus
Yellow-legged gull, Larus michahellis
Caspian gull, Larus cachinnans
Lesser black-backed gull, Larus fuscus (A)
Little tern, Sternula albifronsGull-billed tern, Gelochelidon nilotica
Whiskered tern, Chlidonias hybrida
Common tern, Sterna hirundo
Sandwich tern, Thalasseus sandvicensis

LoonsOrder: GaviiformesFamily: Gaviidae

Loons are a group of aquatic birds found in many parts of North America and Northern Europe. They are the size of a large duck or small goose, which they somewhat resemble in shape when swimming, but to which they are completely unrelated. In particular, loons' legs are set very far back which assists swimming underwater but makes walking on land extremely difficult.

Arctic loon, Gavia arctica

Northern storm-petrelsOrder: ProcellariiformesFamily: Hydrobatidae

Though the members of this family are similar in many respects to the southern storm-petrels, including their general appearance and habits, there are enough genetic differences to warrant their placement in a separate family.

European storm-petrel, Hydrobates pelagicus

Shearwaters and petrelsOrder: ProcellariiformesFamily: Procellariidae

The procellariids are the main group of medium-sized "true petrels", characterised by united nostrils with medium septum and a long outer functional primary.

Cory's shearwater, Calonectris diomedea
Yelkouan shearwater, Puffinus yelkouan

Boobies and gannetsOrder: SuliformesFamily: Sulidae

The sulids comprise the gannets and boobies. Both groups are medium to large coastal seabirds that plunge-dive for fish.

Northern gannet, Morus bassanus

Cormorants and shagsOrder: SuliformesFamily: Phalacrocoracidae

Phalacrocoracidae is a family of medium to large coastal, fish-eating seabirds that includes cormorants and shags. Plumage colouration varies, with the majority having mainly dark plumage, some species being black-and-white and a few being colourful.

Great cormorant, Phalacrocorax carbo
European shag, Gulosus aristotelis

Herons, egrets, and bitternsOrder: PelecaniformesFamily: Ardeidae

The family Ardeidae contains the bitterns, herons, and egrets. Herons and egrets are medium to large wading birds with long necks and legs. Bitterns tend to be shorter necked and more wary. Members of Ardeidae fly with their necks retracted, unlike other long-necked birds such as storks, ibises and spoonbills.

Great bittern, Botaurus stellaris
Little bittern, Ixobrychus minutus
Gray heron, Ardea cinerea
Little egret, Egretta garzetta
Black-crowned night-heron, Nycticorax nycticorax (A)

OspreyOrder: AccipitriformesFamily: Pandionidae

The family Pandionidae contains only one species, the osprey. The osprey is a medium-large raptor which is a specialist fish-eater with a worldwide distribution.

Osprey, Pandion haliaetus

Hawks, eagles, and kitesOrder: AccipitriformesFamily: Accipitridae

Accipitridae is a family of birds of prey, which includes hawks, eagles, kites, harriers and Old World vultures. These birds have powerful hooked beaks for tearing flesh from their prey, strong legs, powerful talons and keen eyesight.

European honey-buzzard, Pernis apivorus
Booted eagle, Hieraaetus pennatus
Golden eagle, Aquila chrysaetos
Hen harrier, Circus cyaneus
Montagu's harrier, Circus pygargus
Eurasian sparrowhawk, Accipiter nisus
Northern goshawk, Accipiter gentilis
Black kite, Milvus migrans
Common buzzard, Buteo buteo

Barn-owlsOrder: StrigiformesFamily: Tytonidae

Barn-owls are medium to large owls with large heads and characteristic heart-shaped faces. They have long strong legs with powerful talons. There are 16 species worldwide and 1 species which occurs in Monaco.

Barn owl, Tyto alba

OwlsOrder: StrigiformesFamily: Strigidae

The typical owls are small to large solitary nocturnal birds of prey. They have large forward-facing eyes and ears, a hawk-like beak and a conspicuous circle of feathers around each eye called a facial disk.

Eurasian scops-owl, Otus scops (A)
Eurasian eagle-owl, Bubo bubo
Little owl, Athene noctua
Tawny owl, Strix aluco
Long-eared owl, Asio otus

HoopoesOrder: BucerotiformesFamily: Upupidae

Hoopoes have black, white and orangey-pink colouring with a large erectile crest on their head.

Eurasian hoopoe, Upupa epops

KingfishersOrder: CoraciiformesFamily: Alcedinidae

Kingfishers are medium-sized birds with large heads, long, pointed bills, short legs and stubby tails.

Common kingfisher, Alcedo atthis

Bee-eatersOrder: CoraciiformesFamily: Meropidae

The bee-eaters are a group of near passerine birds in the family Meropidae. Most species are found in Africa but others occur in southern Europe, Madagascar, Australia and New Guinea. They are characterised by richly coloured plumage, slender bodies and usually elongated central tail feathers. All are colourful and have long downturned bills and pointed wings, which give them a swallow-like appearance when seen from afar.

European bee-eater, Merops apiaster

RollersOrder: CoraciiformesFamily: Coraciidae

Rollers resemble crows in size and build, but are more closely related to the kingfishers and bee-eaters. They share the colourful appearance of those groups with blues and browns predominating. The two inner front toes are connected, but the outer toe is not.

European roller, Coracias garrulus

WoodpeckersOrder: PiciformesFamily: Picidae

Woodpeckers are small to medium-sized birds with chisel-like beaks, short legs, stiff tails and long tongues used for capturing insects. Some species have feet with two toes pointing forward and two backward, while several species have only three toes. Many woodpeckers have the habit of tapping noisily on tree trunks with their beaks.

Eurasian wryneck, Jynx torquilla
Great spotted woodpecker, Dendrocopos major
Lesser spotted woodpecker, Dryobates minor
Eurasian green woodpecker, Picus viridis
Black woodpecker, Dryocopus martius

Falcons and caracarasOrder: FalconiformesFamily: Falconidae

Falconidae is a family of diurnal birds of prey. They differ from hawks, eagles and kites in that they kill with their beaks instead of their talons.

Eurasian kestrel, Falco tinnunculus
Red-footed falcon, Falco vespertinus
Eurasian hobby, Falco subbuteo
Peregrine falcon, Falco peregrinus

ShrikesOrder: PasseriformesFamily: Laniidae

Shrikes are passerine birds known for their habit of catching other birds and small animals and impaling the uneaten portions of their bodies on thorns. A typical shrike's beak is hooked, like a bird of prey.

Red-backed shrike, Lanius collurio
Great gray shrike, Lanius excubitor

Crows, jays, and magpiesOrder: PasseriformesFamily: Corvidae

The family Corvidae includes crows, ravens, jays, choughs, magpies, treepies, nutcrackers and ground jays. Corvids are above average in size among the Passeriformes, and some of the larger species show high levels of intelligence.

Eurasian jay, Garrulus glandarius
Eurasian magpie, Pica pica
Red-billed chough, Pyrrhocorax pyrrhocorax (A) 
Eurasian jackdaw, Corvus monedula
Rook, Corvus frugilegus
Carrion crow, Corvus corone
Hooded crow, Corvus cornix
Common raven, Corvus corax

Tits, chickadees, and titmiceOrder: PasseriformesFamily: Paridae

The Paridae are mainly small stocky woodland species with short stout bills. Some have crests. They are adaptable birds, with a mixed diet including seeds and insects.

Coal tit, Periparus ater
Crested tit, Lophophanes cristatus
Marsh tit, Poecile palustris
Willow tit, Poecile montanus
Eurasian blue tit, Cyanistes caeruleus
Great tit, Parus major

LarksOrder: PasseriformesFamily: Alaudidae

Larks are small terrestrial birds with often extravagant songs and display flights. Most larks are fairly dull in appearance. Their food is insects and seeds.

Wood lark, Lullula arborea
Eurasian skylark, Alauda arvensis

Cisticolas and alliesOrder: PasseriformesFamily: Cisticolidae

The Cisticolidae are warblers found mainly in warmer southern regions of the Old World. They are generally very small birds of drab brown or grey appearance found in open country such as grassland or scrub.

Zitting cisticola, Cisticola juncidis

Reed warblers and alliesOrder: PasseriformesFamily: Acrocephalidae

The members of this family are usually rather large for "warblers". Most are rather plain olivaceous brown above with much yellow to beige below. They are usually found in open woodland, reedbeds, or tall grass. The family occurs mostly in southern to western Eurasia and surroundings, but it also ranges far into the Pacific, with some species in Africa.

Melodious warbler, Hippolais polyglotta
Eurasian reed warbler, Acrocephalus scirpaceus
Great reed warbler, Acrocephalus arundinaceus

SwallowsOrder: PasseriformesFamily: Hirundinidae

The family Hirundinidae is adapted to aerial feeding. They have a slender streamlined body, long pointed wings and a short bill with a wide gape. The feet are adapted to perching rather than walking, and the front toes are partially joined at the base.

Bank swallow, Riparia riparia
Eurasian crag-martin, Ptyonoprogne rupestris
Barn swallow, Hirundo rustica
Common house-martin, Delichon urbicum

Leaf warblersOrder: PasseriformesFamily: Phylloscopidae

Leaf warblers are a family of small insectivorous birds found mostly in Eurasia and ranging into Wallacea and Africa. The species are of various sizes, often green-plumaged above and yellow below, or more subdued with grayish-green to grayish-brown colors.

Willow warbler, Phylloscopus trochilus
Common chiffchaff, Phylloscopus collybita

Bush warblers and alliesOrder: PasseriformesFamily: Scotocercidae

The members of this family are found throughout Africa, Asia, and Polynesia. Their taxonomy is in flux, and some authorities place some genera in other families.

Cetti's warbler, Cettia cetti

Long-tailed titsOrder: PasseriformesFamily: Aegithalidae

Long-tailed tits are a group of small passerine birds with medium to long tails. They make woven bag nests in trees. Most eat a mixed diet which includes insects.

Long-tailed tit, Aegithalos caudatus

Sylviid warblers, parrotbills, and alliesOrder: PasseriformesFamily: Sylviidae

The family Sylviidae is a group of small insectivorous passerine birds. They mainly occur as breeding species, as the common name implies, in Europe, Asia and, to a lesser extent, Africa. Most are of generally undistinguished appearance, but many have distinctive songs.

Eurasian blackcap, Sylvia atricapilla
Garden warbler, Sylvia borin
Lesser whitethroat, Curruca curruca
Western Orphean warbler, Curruca hortensis (A) 
Sardinian warbler, Curruca melanocephala
Moltoni's warbler, Curruca subalpina
Greater whitethroat, Curruca communis
Dartford warbler, Curruca undata (A)

KingletsOrder: PasseriformesFamily: Regulidae

The kinglets, also called crests, are a small group of birds often included in the Old World warblers, but frequently given family status because they also resemble the titmice.

Goldcrest, Regulus regulus
Common firecrest, Regulus ignicapillus

WallcreeperOrder: PasseriformesFamily: Tichodromidae

The wallcreeper is a small bird related to the nuthatch family, which has stunning crimson, grey and black plumage.

Wallcreeper, Tichodroma muraria

NuthatchesOrder: PasseriformesFamily: Sittidae

Nuthatches are small woodland birds. They have the unusual ability to climb down trees head first, unlike other birds which can only go upwards. Nuthatches have big heads, short tails and powerful bills and feet.

Eurasian nuthatch, Sitta europaea

TreecreepersOrder: PasseriformesFamily: Certhiidae

Treecreepers are small woodland birds, brown above and white below. They have thin pointed down-curved bills, which they use to extricate insects from bark. They have stiff tail feathers, like woodpeckers, which they use to support themselves on vertical trees.

Eurasian treecreeper, Certhia familiaris
Short-toed treecreeper, Certhia brachydactyla

WrensOrder: PasseriformesFamily: Troglodytidae

The wrens are mainly small and inconspicuous except for their loud songs. These birds have short wings and thin down-turned bills. Several species often hold their tails upright. All are insectivorous.

Eurasian wren, Troglodytes troglodytes

DippersOrder: PasseriformesFamily: Cinclidae

Dippers are a group of perching birds whose habitat includes aquatic environments in the Americas, Europe and Asia. They are named for their bobbing or dipping movements.

White-throated dipper, Cinclus cinclus

StarlingsOrder: PasseriformesFamily: Sturnidae

Starlings are small to medium-sized passerine birds. Their flight is strong and direct and they are very gregarious. Their preferred habitat is fairly open country. They eat insects and fruit. Plumage is typically dark with a metallic sheen.

European starling, Sturnus vulgaris
Spotless starling, Sturnus unicolor

Thrushes and alliesOrder: PasseriformesFamily: Turdidae

The thrushes are a group of passerine birds that occur mainly in the Old World. They are plump, soft plumaged, small to medium-sized insectivores or sometimes omnivores, often feeding on the ground. Many have attractive songs.

Mistle thrush, Turdus viscivorus
Song thrush, Turdus philomelos
Redwing, Turdus iliacus
Eurasian blackbird, Turdus merula
Fieldfare, Turdus pilaris

Old World flycatchersOrder: PasseriformesFamily: Muscicapidae

Old World flycatchers are a large group of small passerine birds native to the Old World. They are mainly small arboreal insectivores. The appearance of these birds is highly varied, but they mostly have weak songs and harsh calls.

Spotted flycatcher, Muscicapa striata
European robin, Erithacus rubecula
Common nightingale, Luscinia megarhynchos
Common redstart, Phoenicurus phoenicurus
Black redstart, Phoenicurus ochruros
Rufous-tailed rock-thrush, Monticola saxatilis
Blue rock-thrush, Monticola solitarius
Whinchat, Saxicola rubetra
European stonechat, Saxicola rubicola
Northern wheatear, Oenanthe oenanthe
Western black-eared wheatear, Oenanthe hispanica

AccentorsOrder: PasseriformesFamily: Prunellidae

The accentors are in the only bird family, Prunellidae, which is completely endemic to the Palearctic. They are small, fairly drab species superficially similar to sparrows.

Alpine accentor, Prunella collaris
Dunnock, Prunella modularis

Old World sparrowsOrder: PasseriformesFamily: Passeridae

Old World sparrows are small passerine birds. In general, sparrows tend to be small, plump, brown or grey birds with short tails and short powerful beaks. Sparrows are seed eaters, but they also consume small insects.

House sparrow, Passer domesticus
Italian sparrow, Passer italiae
Eurasian tree sparrow, Passer montanus
Rock sparrow, Petronia petronia
White-winged snowfinch, Montifringilla nivalis

Wagtails and pipitsOrder: PasseriformesFamily: Motacillidae

Motacillidae is a family of small passerine birds with medium to long tails. They include the wagtails, longclaws and pipits. They are slender, ground feeding insectivores of open country.

Gray wagtail, Motacilla cinerea
Western yellow wagtail, Motacilla flava
White wagtail, Motacilla alba
Tawny pipit, Anthus campestris
Meadow pipit, Anthus pratensis
Tree pipit, Anthus trivialis
Water pipit, Anthus spinoletta

 Finches, euphonias, and alliesOrder: PasseriformesFamily: Fringillidae

Finches are seed-eating passerine birds, that are small to moderately large and have a strong beak, usually conical and in some species very large. All have twelve tail feathers and nine primaries. These birds have a bouncing flight with alternating bouts of flapping and gliding on closed wings, and most sing well.

Common chaffinch, Fringilla coelebs
Brambling, Fringilla montifringilla
Hawfinch, Coccothraustes coccothraustes
Eurasian bullfinch, Pyrrhula pyrrhula
European greenfinch, Chloris chloris
Eurasian linnet, Linaria cannabina
Red crossbill, Loxia curvirostra
European goldfinch, Carduelis carduelis
Citril finch, Carduelis citrinella
European serin, Serinus serinus
Eurasian siskin, Spinus spinus

Old World buntingsOrder: PasseriformesFamily: Emberizidae

The emberizids are a large family of passerine birds. They are seed-eating birds with distinctively shaped bills. Many emberizid species have distinctive head patterns.

Corn bunting, Emberiza calandra
Rock bunting, Emberiza cia
Yellowhammer, Emberiza citrinella
Ortolan bunting, Emberiza hortulana
Reed bunting, Emberiza schoeniclus

See also
List of birds
Lists of birds by region

ReferencesSourcesCitations'

Lists of birds by country
Lists of birds of Europe
Birds
Birds